Ab Chenaru (also Romanized as Āb Chenārū; also known as Āb Chenār) is a village in Jaydasht Rural District, in the Central District of Firuzabad County, Fars Province, Iran. The population of Ab Chenaru was 34 people, spread between six families, in the 2006 census.

References 

Populated places in Firuzabad County